Iris Gwendolyne M. Loveridge (10 April 1917 – 6 November 2000) was an English classical pianist.

Born in West Ham, Essex, she attended the Royal College of Music, and later the Royal Academy. She specialised in British contemporary music, including piano sonatas by Arnold Bax, Gordon Jacob (of which she was the dedicatee), E. J. Moeran and Edmund Rubbra. In 1947 she also gave the UK premiere of William Schuman's Piano Concerto with the BBC Symphony Orchestra under Basil Cameron. She also performed in duet with the oboist Evelyn Rothwell (Lady Barbirolli). In addition, she made appearances at the Henry Wood Proms. She retired professionally in 1995.

Her recordings of Bax's piano works (not quite a complete survey of his piano output, though most of his pieces for the instrument are represented) were recently re-issued on CD by Lyrita Records.

She married Henry Morriss in 1966, but continued to perform under her maiden name.  Henry died in 1995.  Iris Loveridge died in Gloucester.

References

1917 births
2000 deaths
People from West Ham
Alumni of the Royal College of Music
English classical pianists
English women pianists
20th-century classical pianists
20th-century English musicians
20th-century English women musicians
Women classical pianists
20th-century women pianists